Jeremiah T. “Jay” O'Grady (born June 30, 1970) is an American politician and a Democratic member of the Rhode Island House of Representatives representing District 46 since January 2011.

Education
O'Grady earned his BA from the University of Vermont and his MPA from the University of Rhode Island.

Elections
2012 O'Grady was challenged in the September 11, 2012 Democratic Primary winning with 785 votes (64%) against former Representative John Barr and won the four-way November 6, 2012 General election with 2,738 votes (38.5%) against returning 2010 opponents Republican Matthew Guerra, former Representative Mary Ann Shallcross Smith (running as an Independent), and Paul DiDomenico.
2010 O'Grady challenged District 46 Representative Shallcross Smith in the September 23, 2010 Democratic Primary, winning by 90 votes with 836 votes (52.8%) and won the four-way November 2, 2010 General election, winning with 2,150 votes (48.9%) against Republican nominee Matthew Guerra and Independent candidates C. Kevin McCarthy and Paul DiDomenico.

References

External links
Official page at the Rhode Island General Assembly

Jeremiah O'Grady at Ballotpedia
Jeremiah T. O'Grady at the National Institute on Money in State Politics

Place of birth missing (living people)
1970 births
Living people
Democratic Party members of the Rhode Island House of Representatives
People from Providence County, Rhode Island
University of Rhode Island alumni
University of Vermont alumni
21st-century American politicians